Vohibato is a district of Haute Matsiatra in Madagascar.

Communes
The district is further divided into 15 communes:

 Alakamisy Itenina
 Andranomiditra
 Andranovorivato
 Ankaromalaza Mifanasoa
 Ihazoara
 Lamosina
 Mahaditra
 Mahasoabe
 Maneva
 Soaindrana
 Talata Ampano
 Vinanitelo
 Vohibato Ouest
 Vohimarina
 Vohitrafeno

References 

Districts of Haute Matsiatra